Xenia Noelle Field MBE (née Lowinsky; 25 December 1894 – 24 January 1998) was a British county councillor, prison reformer, philanthropist, horticulturist and author.

Early life
Field was born on 25 December 1894 at Secunderabad, India, where her father Thomas Hermann Lowinsky was general manager of the Hyderabad (Deccan) Co coal mines. On their return to England, the family lived at Tittenhurst Park in Berkshire. Field was a pupil at Heathfield School, and then attended finishing school in Paris. Her father was a keen gardener, who won a Royal Horticultural Society gold medal.

Career
In World War II, after a stint in the Women's Royal Voluntary Service, she led the Women's Organization for Salvage and Recovery for Herbert Morrison of the Ministry of Supply.

With Morrison's support, she was elected as a Labour member of London County Council in 1946, representing Paddington North electoral division. She stood, unsuccessfully, for parliament, first at North Somerset in 1950 and then at Colchester in 1951. She also sat as a magistrate, and became interested in prison reform. She joined the breakaway Social Democratic Party in 1982, shortly after their formation.

She used a bequest from her father to establish a charitable trust, the Field Foundation, under whose auspices she gave financial support to The Salvation Army, persuading them to set up the first bail hostel in Britain, in 1971. She was made a Member of the Order of the British Empire (MBE) in 1958, and appeared as a castaway on the BBC Radio programme Desert Island Discs on 12 June 1967. She also won the Royal Horticultural Society's Veitch Memorial Medal, in 1972.

Personal life
She married Dr. James Field, a much older man, in 1936; he died only five years later.

Death
She died at Goldsborough Nursing Home, Ladbroke Road, Kensington, London on 24 January 1998, from a stroke. She was 103.

Bibliography

References 

1894 births
1998 deaths
People from Telangana
English garden writers
Prison reformers
English centenarians
Members of the Order of the British Empire
Members of London County Council
English civil servants
English horticulturists
English philanthropists
Labour Party (UK) councillors
Social Democratic Party (UK) politicians
Veitch Memorial Medal recipients
British reformers
English justices of the peace
Labour Party (UK) parliamentary candidates
English people of Hungarian descent

20th-century British philanthropists
Women centenarians
Women councillors in England
British people in colonial India